Gomer was the son of Japheth in the Hebrew Bible, and the wife of Hosea (two different Gomers).

People with the given name or surname include:

Gomer Berry, 1st Viscount Kemsley (1883–1968), Welsh colliery owner and newspaper publisher
Gomer Gunn (1885–1935), Welsh rugby union and rugby league footballer 
Gomer Hughes (1910–1974), Welsh rugby union and rugby league footballer
Gomer Jones (1914–1971), American football player, coach and college athletics administrator
Gomer Griffith Smith (1896–1953), American politician
David Gomér (1897–1977), Swedish politician
Ez Gomér (born 1962), Swedish vocalist, bass player, songwriter and producer
Joseph Gomer (missionary) (1834–1892), African American missionary
Joseph Gomer (pilot) (1920–2013), African-American World War II pilot, one of the Tuskegee Airmen
Robert Gomer (1924–2016), Austrian chemist and professor
Sara Gomer (born 1964), English retired tennis player
Steve Gomer, American film and television director who made his debut in 1987